LTN may refer to:
 Luton Airport, England, IATA code
 Lothian, region in Scotland, Chapman code
 Low Traffic Neighbourhood, scheme of traffic calming in the UK